Carlos Califo Seidi (born 22 September 1989) simply Califo, is a Portuguese-born Bissau-Guinean footballer who plays for Sintrense as a defender.

Football career
On 4 August 2013, Califo made his professional debut with Oliveirense in a 2013–14 Taça da Liga match against Sporting Covilhã, when he started and played the full game. In the first match of the  2013–14 Segunda Liga season against Penafiel on the 11 August, he made his league debut.

Internationally, Califo made his senior début for Guinea Bissau on 19 July 2014.

References

External links

Stats and profile at LPFP

1989 births
Living people
Footballers from Lisbon
Portuguese sportspeople of Bissau-Guinean descent
Portuguese footballers
Citizens of Guinea-Bissau through descent
Bissau-Guinean footballers
Guinea-Bissau international footballers
Association football defenders
U.D. Oliveirense players
Liga Portugal 2 players
S.C. Farense players
S.C.U. Torreense players
GS Loures players
S.U. Sintrense players